Percy Brodrick Bernard (17 September 1844 – 18 July 1912) was an Irish Conservative Party politician who sat briefly in the House of Commons in 1880.

Bernard was the son of Charles Brodrick Bernard, Bishop of Tuam, and his wife Jane Grace Dorothea Freke. He was a nephew of Francis Bernard, 3rd Earl of Bandon. In 1866 Bernard was commissioned as an officer in the South Cork Light Infantry Militia.

Bernard was elected as a Member of Parliament for Bandon in April 1880. He resigned in June 1880 by becoming Steward of the Manor of Northstead.

Bernard lived at Freckenham, Suffolk, and died at the age of 67.

Bernard married firstly Isabel Emma Beatrice Lane in April 1872. His second wife whom he married in February 1880 was Mary Lissey Kirwan who inherited the  estate of Castlehacket. He married a third time in June 1900 to Evangeline Hoare, daughter of Henry Hoare (1838–1898) of Staplehurst. After his death she married Charles Hedley Strutt (MP). His son General Sir Denis Bernard was Governor of Bermuda.

References

External links 
 

1844 births
1912 deaths
Members of the Parliament of the United Kingdom for County Cork constituencies (1801–1922)
UK MPs 1880–1885
Irish Conservative Party MPs